Madison Wetland Management District is located in the U.S. state of South Dakota and includes 129,700 acres (524 km2). 38,500 acres (155 km2) is owned by the U.S. Government while the remaining area is protected through easements in agreement with the state and other entities. The refuge is managed by the U.S. Fish and Wildlife Service. The wetlands are a part of the Prairie Pothole Region, well known to be an outstanding natural resource area that is vital for migratory bird species. As the Great plains were being plowed under, conservationists groups worked towards ensuring wetlands would be preserved to protect these areas. Now known as Waterfowl Production Areas, preservation of this region helps to ensure a sustainable population of hundreds of migratory bird species and other plant and animal species dependent on this ecosystem.

The refuge allows fishing and hunting in limited areas and in season.

References

External links
 

National Wildlife Refuges in South Dakota
Protected areas established in 1962
Wetlands of South Dakota
Landforms of Lake County, South Dakota
Protected areas of Lake County, South Dakota
1962 establishments in South Dakota